Michael Edward Butler (born October 22, 1946 - November 18, 2018) was an American professional basketball player born in Memphis, Tennessee.

He was selected in the 1968 NBA draft by the San Diego Rockets, and in the 1972 American Basketball Association (ABA) Draft by the San Diego Conquistadors. He played four seasons in the ABA with the New Orleans Buccaneers and the Utah Stars.

Since retiring from professional basketball, Butler has been working in the transportation and distribution business. He lives in Lakeland, Tennessee.

Butler lived in St. Louis, Missouri for a short period of time (1959–1961) and attended Lindbergh High School. From 1962–1964 Mike played for Coach Bill Todd at Memphis Kingsbury High School. In 102 games he set the then Shelby Metro Area Record by scoring 1,976 points.

Notes

External links
ABA stats @ basketballreference.com
https://www.peeblesfuneralhome.com/notices/MichaelMike-Butler 

1946 births
Living people
American men's basketball players
Basketball players from Memphis, Tennessee
Guards (basketball)
Memphis Tigers men's basketball players
New Orleans Buccaneers players
San Diego Rockets draft picks
Utah Stars players